The following is a list of county-maintained roads in Aitkin County, Minnesota, United States. Some of the routes included in this list are also county-state-aid-highways (CSAH.)

Route list

References

 
 

 
Aitkin